Uli Maurer (born January 19, 1985) is a German professional ice hockey forward who currently plays for SC Riessersee of the Oberliga (Ger.3). He previously played with the Schwenninger Wild Wings on a two-year contract on April 27, 2016, freshly off claiming the German championship in the 2015–16 season with EHC München.

References

External links

1985 births
Living people
Augsburger Panther players
German ice hockey forwards
EHC München players
Nürnberg Ice Tigers players
SC Riessersee players
Schwenninger Wild Wings players
Sportspeople from Garmisch-Partenkirchen